Asenov is a Bulgarian surname. Notable people with the surname include:

 Borislav Asenov (born 1959), Bulgarian cyclist
 Dimitar Nikolov Asenov, known as Hadzhi Dimitar (1840–1868), Bulgarian revolutionary
 Krastyo Asenov (1877–1903), Bulgarian revolutionary, nephew of Dimitar
 Nikola Asenov (born 1983), Bulgarian footballer
 Stefan Asenov (born 1972), Bulgarian modern pentathlete
 Yordan Asenov (1869–1936), Bulgarian revolutionary, brother of Krastyo
 Venka Asenova (1930–1986), Bulgarian women chess grandmaster

See also
Asenov, Veliko Tarnovo, district in Bulgaria

Bulgarian-language surnames